The Godunov map was an ethnographic map of Siberia commissioned by Alexis of Russia on 15 November 1667. The original is no longer extant, but two copies were made: one by Claes Johansson Prytz and the other by Fritz Cronman. It is named after Petr Ivanovich Godunov the governor (voivode) of Tobolsk.

References

Historic maps of Asia
Maps of Russia
Ethnic maps
History of Siberia
17th-century maps and globes
ru:Фёдор II Годунов#Карта России